Kaihikapu may refer to:
 Kaihikapu-a-Kakuhihewa Hawaiian chief of the island of Oahu
 Kaihikapu-a-Manuia 14th Alii Aimoku of Oahu
 Virginia Kaihikapumahana Wilcox (1895–1954), daughter of Princess Theresa Owana Kaohelelani of the House of Laanui